Rozterk  is a village in the administrative district of Gmina Praszka, within Olesno County, Opole Voivodeship, in south-western Poland.

The village has a population of 270.

References

Rozterk